Gorriti is a locality in Larraun, Norte de Aralar, Navarre, Spain.

Its population as of 2014 was of 84 inhabitants

References

Populated places in Navarre